Michigan's 10th congressional district is a United States congressional district in the Lower Peninsula of Michigan. It consists of southern Macomb County, Rochester and Rochester Hills in Oakland County.

District boundaries were redrawn in 1992, 2002, 2012, and 2022 due to reapportionment following the censuses of 1990, 2000, 2010, and 2020.

The current district is considered quite competitive. Southern Macomb County tends to support Democratic candidates, while central Macomb County and Rochester/Rochester Hills tend to be more moderate. From 2021-2022, Lisa McClain represented the 10th; after redistricting moved McClain to the neighboring 9th district, John E. James was elected to represent it since 2023.

Cities since 2023

Center Line
Clinton Township
Eastpointe
Fraser
Grosse Pointe Shores (Macomb County portion)
Harrison Township
Macomb Township (portions)
Mount Clemens
Rochester
Rochester Hills
Roseville
St. Clair Shores
Shelby Township
Sterling Heights
Utica
Warren

Recent election results from statewide races

History
From 1992 to 2002 the 10th congressional district included St. Clair County, and slightly more than half of Macomb Counties population, but lacking the cities of Sterling Heights, Michigan and Warren, Michigan. In the 2002 redistricting Lapeer County, Huron County, Sanilac County and about two thirds of Sterling Heights were added to the district. At the same time Clinton Township, Mt. Clemens, St. Clair Shores, Fraser and Roseville were removed from the district.

Prior to the 1992 redistricting the 10th district had its largest city as Midland and roughly corresponded to the present 4th district. The post-1992 10th district was very similar to the previous 12th district, although it took small areas from the 18th district, the 14th district and the 8th district, and lost north-west Warren to the new 12th district.

List of members representing the district

Recent election results

2012

2014

2016

2018

2020

2022

See also
Michigan's congressional districts
List of United States congressional districts

Notes

References
 
 
 
 
 Congressional Biographical Directory of the United States 1774–present

External links
Michigan 10th Congressional District Republicans
10th Congressional District Democratic Committee

10
Huron County, Michigan
Lapeer County, Michigan
St. Clair County, Michigan
Sanilac County, Michigan
Port Huron, Michigan
Macomb County, Michigan
Tuscola County, Michigan
Constituencies established in 1883
1883 establishments in Michigan